Operation Orator was the code name for the defence of the Allied Arctic convoy PQ 18 by British and Australian air force units, based temporarily in North-West Russia, against attack by the German battleship  and other  surface vessels. The wing, known as the Search & Strike Force, was commanded by Group Captain Frank Hopps and its maritime strike element was the Leuchars Wing, comprising No. 144 Squadron, Royal Air Force (RAF) and No. 455 Squadron, Royal Australian Air Force (RAAF) equipped with Handley-Page Hampden TB 1 torpedo bombers.

The two squadrons lost nine aircraft shot down or crashed in transit but the remainder joined a detachment of 210 Squadron Catalina flying boats and a section of photographic reconnaissance Spitfires from 1 Photographic Reconnaissance Unit to make up the Search & Strike Force (S&SF).

At  on 14 September, 23 Hampdens were scrambled, after Tirpitz was reported absent from its moorings. The Hampdens flew to the maximum distance that Tirpitz could have reached then turned to follow the track back to Altafjord, as far as the Catalina cross over patrols. The S&SF Hampdens stayed at readiness and the Spitfires watched over Tirpitz until October. Operation Orator had deterred the Germans from risking their capital ships against PQ 18 and after converting the Soviet Air Forces (VVS) to the Hampden and Spitfire aircraft to be left behind, the aircrew and ground personnel returned to Britain.

Background

Arctic convoys

A motley of British, Allied and neutral shipping loaded with military stores and raw materials for the Soviet war effort would be assembled at Hvalfjörður, Iceland, an anchorage convenient for ships from both sides of the Atlantic.

By late 1941, the convoy system used in the Atlantic had been established on the Arctic run; a convoy commodore ensured that the ships' masters and signals officers attended a briefing to make arrangements for the management of the convoy, which sailed in a formation of long rows of short columns. The commodore was usually a retired naval officer, aboard a ship identified by a white pendant with a blue cross. The commodore was assisted by a Naval signals party of four men, who used lamps, semaphore flags and telescopes to pass signals, coded from books carried in a weighted bag, to be dumped overboard in an emergency. In large convoys, the commodore was assisted by vice- and rear-commodores who directed the speed, course and zig-zagging of the merchant ships in co-operation with the escort commander.

Convoy hiatus
Following Convoy PQ 16 and the disaster to PQ 17 in July 1942, Arctic convoys were suspended for nine weeks and much of the Home Fleet was detached to the Mediterranean. During the lull, Admiral John "Jack" Tovey concluded that the Home Fleet had been of no great protection to convoys once beyond Bear Island, midway between Svalbard and the North Cape of Norway. Tovey planned to oversee the operation from Scapa Flow, where the fleet was linked to the Admiralty by landline and immune to variations in wireless reception. The next convoy was to be accompanied by the longer-range destroyers of the Home Fleet. Along with the close escort force of anti-submarine and anti-aircraft ships, the fleet destroyers could confront a sortie by German ships with the threat of a massed torpedo attack. Instead of meeting homeward-bound QP convoys near Bear Island, QP 14 was to remain in port until PQ 18 was near its destination, despite the longer journey being more demanding of the escort crews, fuel and equipment. The new escort carrier  (Commander A. P. Colthurst) had arrived from the United States and was added to the escort force.

Signals intelligence

The British Government Code and Cypher School (GC&CS) based at Bletchley Park housed a small industry of code-breakers and traffic analysts. By June 1941, the code-breakers could read quickly German Enigma machine cyphers in the Home Waters settings for surface ships and U-boats. On 1 February 1942, the Enigma machines used in U-boats in the Atlantic and Mediterranean were made more complex and it was not until December 1942 that the British could read the new Shark cypher. The older version remained in use by German ships the U-boats in Arctic waters. By mid-1941, British Y-stations were able to receive and read  Wireless telegraphy (W/T) transmissions and give advance warning of  operations. In 1941, interception parties (Headaches) were embarked on warships and from May 1942, computers sailed with the cruiser admirals in command of convoy escorts, to intercept  W/T signals beyond the range of land stations in Britain. The Admiralty sent details of  wireless frequencies, call signs and the daily local codes to the computers. Combined with their knowledge of  procedures, the computers could give fairly accurate details of German reconnaissance sorties and sometimes predicted attacks twenty minutes before they appeared on radar.

Allied Arctic operations

As Arctic convoys passed by the North Cape of Norway into the Barents Sea, they were easily within range of German aircraft, U-boats and ships based in Norway and Finland. In Operation Dervish (21–31 August 1941), six elderly freighters sailed from Iceland for Archangelsk carrying wood, rubber, tin and fifteen crated Hawker Hurricane fighters. In Operation Strength, the aircraft carrier  carried 24 Hurricanes concurrent with the convoy, escorted by three cruisers with the RAF ground party. When Argus was in range of Vayenga, the Hurricanes were flown off and all reached their destination.

No. 151 Wing RAF (Wing Commander Neville Ramsbottom-Isherwood) flew in the defence of Murmansk for five weeks and claimed 16 victories, four probables and seven aircraft damaged. The winter snows began on 22 September and the conversion of Soviet Air Force (VVS) pilots and ground crews to the Hurricane Mk IID began in mid-October and in late November the RAF party returned to Britain, less various signals staff. The Allied Operation Gauntlet (25 August – 3 September 1941), Fritham (30 April 1942 – 2 July 1943) had taken place in the Svalbard Archipelago on the main island of Spitsbergen, midway between northern Norway the North Pole, to eliminate German weather stations and to stop its coal exports to Norway. In Operation Gearbox II (2–21 September 1942)  two cruisers and a destroyer took  of supplies and equipment to Spitsbergen. On 3 September, Force P, the oilers ,  and four destroyer escorts sailed for Van Mijenfjorden (Lowe Sound) in Spitsbergen and from 9 to 13 September refuelled destroyers detached from PQ 18.

German plans

Three flag officers were detached to Oslo in command of minesweeping, coast defence, patrols and minelaying off the west, north and polar coasts. The large surface ships and U-boats were under the command of the Flag Officer Northern Waters at Narvik, who did not answer to Boehm but had authority over the Flag Officer Battlegroup, who commanded the ships when at sea. The Norwegian-based aircraft had tactical headquarters at Kirkenes, Trondheim and Bardufoss. The  HQs were separate from the  commanders except at Kirkenes, with the Flag Officer Polar Coast.

On 24 June, a British minesweeper based at Kola was sunk by Ju 87 Stuka dive-bombers and on 16 August, Admiral Scheer conducted Operation Wunderland, a sortie against Russian ships thought to be sailing along the route north of Siberia. Admiral Scheer sailed north of Novaya Zemlya and then to the east and sank a Soviet icebreaker; by 30 August Admiral Scheer was back in Narvik.  signals interception and documents recovered from the crashed Hampden UB-C, revealed the crossover and escort changeover points of convoys PQ 18 and QP 14 and other details including Operation Orator. U-boats, destroyers and the minelayer Ulm sailed on Operation Zar to sow mines at the entrance of the White Sea and off Novaya Zemlya. The Germans had to press Admiral Hipper into service as a minelayer. Tirpitz, the cruiser Lützow and three destroyers had been in dock for repairs since  against Convoy PQ 17 (2–5 July) and were not available. Twelve U-boats formed a patrol group in the Norwegian Sea against PQ 18 and the  planned  (Operation Double Hit) in which the cruisers Admiral Scheer, Admiral Hipper and Köln with four destroyer escorts, would sail against the convoy.

(Golden Comb)

Ju 88 bombers were to divert the defenders with medium and dive bombing attacks as the torpedo-bombers approached out of the twilight. The torpedo bombers were to fly towards the convoy in line abreast, at wave-top height to evade radar, as the convoy was silhouetted against the lighter sky, then drop their torpedoes in a salvo. When  discovered that an aircraft carrier would accompany the next convoy,  Hermann Göring gave orders that it must be sunk first;  aircrew were told that the destruction of the convoy was the best way to help the German army at Stalingrad and in Caucasus in southern Russia.

Operation Orator

Plan 

A Search & Strike Force (S&SF), commanded by Group Captain Frank Hopps, was to fly to north Russia and operate over the Barents Sea. The maritime strike element comprised 16 Handley Page Hampden torpedo-bombers each from 144 Squadron, Royal Air Force (RAF) and 455 Squadron, Royal Australian Air Force (RAAF). The search element comprised nine Catalinas detached from 210 Squadron RAF from RAF Sullom Voe, in Shetland, to operate from Lake Lakhta near Arkhangelsk, to keep watch on the waters north of Altafjord and a section of three RAF 1 Photographic Reconnaissance Unit (1 PRU) Extra-Super-Long-Range Spitfire PR Mk IV(D) flown from RAF Sumburgh in shetland, to operate from Afrikanda to watch over Tirpitz. The Spitfires and Catalinas were to keep watch on the bigger  ships in Norwegian waters, including the battleship Tirpitz, to attack them at the first opportunity.

Deployment of the Search & Strike Force 
On 13 August, Hopps, RAF and RAAF ground staff and a medical unit sailed for Russia on the cruiser Tuscaloosa, along with three destroyers (two US and one British). The 210 Squadron Catalinas had to remain on operations until the last minute and their equipment and ground crews also had to travel by air but the distance was easily within Catalina range.

On 2 September 1942, as PQ 18 departed from Loch Ewe, the 32 Hampdens of the Search & Strike Force flew from their base at RAF Leuchars to Sumburgh. There was no time to fit long-range fuel tanks and each Hampden was to carry a member of the ground staff, the rest travelling to Murmansk on Tuscaloosa, with the Mk XII torpedoes, munitions and other stores. On 3 September an attempt to send the squadrons to Russia despite an unfavourable weather report, in fear of even worse weather to come, was refused by McLaughlin and Lindeman and the squadrons waited for better weather.

Late on 4 September, the Hampdens of the Leuchars Wing took off for Russia. The Hampden crews were to follow a route similar to that of the Spitfires, flying north to Burrafirth in Shetland and the fly on a course to reach Norway at 66°N, cross the mountains in the dark, overfly northern Sweden and Finland, before landing at the Soviet air base at Afrikanda, at the southern end of Murmansk Oblast. The flight to Afrikanda was expected to take five to eight hours, depending on the weather and German opposition. After refuelling, the Hampden crews were to fly the remaining  to Vayenga, following the Kandalaksha–Murmansk railway northwards.

Two Hampdens crashed in northern Sweden, near Arjeplog; both crashes were thought to have been caused by atmospheric icing. Four RAAF, three RCAF and one RAFVR crew were killed and buried at Kviberg Cemetery, Gothenburg. There were no survivors from Hampden P5304 ("UB-H") of 455 Squadron, piloted by Sgt Edward Smart, when it crashed on 4/5 September by lake Arvestuottar, after passing over the larger lake Arvesjaure (sv) to the north-west. Evans and his supernumerary, Corporal Bernard Sowerby, survived the crash and made a three-day trek to the nearest village. Under international law, combatant aircraft entering a neutral country during wartime have normally been subject to impounding and their crews to internment and these laws were being enforced. To avoid internment, Evans and Sowerby told the Swedish authorities that they had crashed in Norway and walked across the border; they were repatriated to Britain on 21 September.

Four Hampdens were either shot down or forced to land in German-held territory. AT109 ("UB-C") of 455 Squadron, piloted by  Sqn Ldr James Catanach, landed on a beach in northern Norway after being damaged by flak from a German submarine chaser and the crew were taken prisoner. Sergeant J. C. R. (John) Bray (RAAF), the pilot, bailed out and became a prisoner of war. AT138 crashed near Alakurtti. P1344 "PL-K", piloted by P/O E. H. E. Perry, suffered from icing and was forced to take an alternate, lower altitude route. The Hampden flew over the  base at Petsamo, where P1344 was damaged by FlaK; it was then attacked by two Messerschmitt Bf 109 fighters of JG 5. During a crash-landing in an Axis-held part of the Kola Peninsula, three crewmembers were killed and Perry was seriously injured; he and his passenger were taken prisoner. P1273 "PL-Q", piloted by Sgt H. L. (Hank) Bertrand, was attacked by fighters from JG 5 near Petsamo; the crew and passenger bailed out and were captured. Plans for PQ 18 and QP 14 were recovered by the Germans from "UB-C" and with a decoded signal from the Soviet 95th Naval Flight Regiment, provided the Germans with the itinerary for both convoys.

Davenport did so after his Hampden was intercepted by VVS fighter pilots, who directed him to land. Two Hampdens ran out of fuel over Russia and were damaged in forced landings at or near Afrikanda. One pilot made a wheels-up landing in soft ground at Khibiniy, several miles north of Afrikanda and the other Hampden was written off after hitting tree stumps. A further Hampden was lost on the Afrikanda–Murmansk leg. AE356, piloted by Sgt Walter Hood (144 Sqn), was caught up in a German air raid over the Kola Inlet and was attacked in error by VVS fighter pilots. Forced to ditch in a lake, the crew were strafed in the water and the ventral gunner, Sgt Walter Tabor (RCAF) died, either from bullet wounds or drowning when the aircraft sank. The survivors got ashore and received small-arms fire from Soviet troops until they were recognised as Allies (from their shouts of ""); 23 Hampdens arrived at Soviet airfields intact or with only minor damage.

Convoy PQ 18

Tigris made an abortive torpedo attack on Admiral Scheer and erroneously reported it as Tirpitz.

Scheer and its escorts remained far to the north of PQ 18 as the convoy rounded the North Cape. Operation EV, the escort operation for the forty Allied freighters in the convoy comprised an exceptionally large number of navy ships, including Avenger, the first escort carrier to accompany an Arctic convoy. Detailed information on German intentions was provided by Allied code breakers, through Ultra signals decrypts and eavesdropping on  wireless communications. From 12 to 21 September, PQ 18 was attacked by bombers, torpedo-bombers, U-boats and mines, which sank thirteen ships at a cost of forty-four aircraft and four U-boats. The escort ships and the aircraft of Avenger were able to use signals intelligence from the Admiralty to provide early warning of some air attacks and to attempt evasive routeing of the convoy around concentrations of U-boats.

Air operations from Russia

The Catalinas of 210 Squadron were to provide a close escort for PQ 18 at the beginning and end of its journey. The Catalina detachment based in Russia carried overload tanks instead of depth charges and could only menace the U-boats and report their positions to Allied naval ships. The main task of the Catalinas was to maintain ten crossover patrols, AA to KK,  from the Norwegian coast, from west of Narvik to east of the North Cape. It would be impossible for a sortie by the German ships in north Norway to pass through without being detected by Air to Surface Vessel (ASV) radar. As PQ 18 sailed around Norway, the patrol areas moved north-eastwards; AA to CC were flown by the Catalinas from Shetland, as were DD to EE but the aircraft flew on to Russia. EE was the furthest from both bases and five aircraft were necessary to keep continuously one aircraft in the patrol area; areas FF to KK were flown by the detachment in Russia. The flights from Shetland could take 16 hours before the first landfall and low stratus cloud often prevented celestial navigation, the crew having to rely on dead reckoning instead.

The Catalinas detached to Russia, were based at Lake Lakhta near Archangelsk on the White Sea; using Grasnaya on the Kola Inlet as an advanced base. The communications between them were impossible; Hopps used Grasnaya instead, which was  nearer to the patrol areas and equally closer to occupied Norway. Lake Lakhta became a rest area and the base for close escort of PQ 18, once it was on the final leg of the journey. The Catalinas bound for Russia left Shetland in sequence, completed the circuits of their patrol area and proceeded to Russia. From above, the Arctic tundra looked uninviting but having landed, the crews found the Soviet Naval Aviation base at Lake Lakhta an idyllic setting, lying amidst woods and cliffs. Russian ground crews were found to be very efficient, impressing the British with their ability to improvise. The damaged Hampden from Khibiniy was put back into service and a Catalina damaged by a  aircraft was hauled ashore within eight minutes of landing and swiftly repaired; once begun, work went on until aircraft were serviceable. The flight from Lake Lakhta to Grasnaya took about five hours and once over PQ 18, the Catalina would circle it, keeping a careful watch on aircraft nearby in case of mistaken identity. 

By 5 September, the serviceable Hampdens were at Vayenga, further back from the front line than Polyarny. An Area Combined HQ was set up at Polyarny, where a Senior British Naval Officer, Rear-Admiral Douglas Fisher was already installed. The PR Spitfires at Vayenga had their RAF roundels painted out and replaced by red stars: oblique F 24 cameras were used on twelve sorties to Narvik and Altafjord, flying through foul weather to keep watch over the German ships. To replace the written off Spitfire, 1 PRU despatched another Spitfire, which arrived from Britain on 16 September, along with a de Havilland Mosquito PR Mk I (W4061).

On the night of 13/14 September, communications between PQ 18 and Lake Lakhta failed, a Catalina at Grasnaya was unable to take off until dawn and the PR sortie found Altafjord covered by cloud. If the Catalina sent a sighting report, it would come too late for the Hampdens to attack and as a precaution, Hopps ordered the 23 operational Hampdens up  on 14 September, for a reconnaissance in force. Each aircraft carried an 18 inch Mark XII torpedo and the force flew to the maximum distance that Tirpitz could have reached then turned to follow the track back to Altafjord, as far as the Catalina patrol zone. After a flight of  hours, the Hampdens returned at  later to discover that Tirpitz had merely moved to a nearby fiord. The other German ships were photographed at Altafiord by the PR Spitfires on 14, 15 and 16 September.

The Hampdens remained dispersed around Vayenga airfield, receiving some damage during air raids. Some sources suggest that Walker was hit by ground fire near Alta airfield, on the outward leg to the fiord. Vayenga airfield was bombed the same day by two Ju 88s in a low-level raid. The Yak crashed through the roof of a three-storey barracks assigned to S&SF commissioned officers and the building caught fire; the S&SF suffered no casualties and its members helped to put out the fire.

Aftermath

Analysis
In the 2005 edition of Arctic Airmen... Ernest Schofield and Roy Nesbit wrote that "it is reasonable to assume that the aircraft based in north Russia had worried the German commander". Chris Mann in a 2012 study of British wartime strategy towards Norway, called it an expensive victory and in 2017, Jan Forsgren in a book on RAF attacks on Tirpitz called the operation a success, because no Axis surface vessels approached PQ 18. PQ 18 was also judged a success by the Allies, having revived the Arctic convoy route to the USSR and because Tirpitz, Admiral Scheer, Admiral Hipper and Köln had been deterred by Operation Orator from attacking the convoy.

In 2011, Michael Walling called the loss of nine Hampdens on the transit flight, the equivalent of the loss anticipated on an attack against a big warship, a disaster. The surviving Hampdens were to be flown back to Scotland but the crews had doubts about the prevailing west–east headwinds, which could push the aircraft beyond their maximum range. Wing Commander Grant Lindeman, the CO of 455 Squadron, called the flight "suicidal". On 1 October, Soviet authorities made a formal request for the Hampdens. The RAF agreed to donate the Hampdens and PR Spitfires to the VVS; S&SF personnel were to return to Britain by sea after helping to convert the Soviet air- and ground-crews to both types. All but one of the Catalinas was flown back to Britain, once QP 14 had passed through the danger zone.

Aircraft losses

Handley-Page Hampden TB 1 (4–5 September 1942)

144 Squadron RAF (squadron code prefix "PL")
 AE310 squadron code unknown, pilot unknown: fuel shortage over Afrikanda led to a forced landing, the crew was unhurt but the aircraft was damaged. (AE310 or P5323 was repaired and returned to service.)
At risk of internment for violating Swedish neutrality, they claimed to have crashed in Norway and were later repatriated to the UK.
 AE356 "PL-?", Sergeant Walter Hood: shot down accidentally by fighters of the VVS into a lake near Murmansk, ventral gunner died of wounds and/or drowning.
AT138 crashed near Alakurtti.
 P1273 "PL-Q", Sergeant Harry Bertrand: attacked by fighters from JG 5 over Finland; the crew and their passenger bailed out and became Prisoners of war. PL-Q crashed in a swamp near Petsamo (later known as Pechenga).
 P1344 "PL-K", P/O E. H. E. Perry: damaged by flak, as it passed directly over Petsamo airfield and subsequently attacked by two Messerschmitt Bf 109s of JG 5. During a crash-landing in an Axis-held part of the Kola Peninsula, three crewmembers were killed and Perry was seriously injured. He and his passenger were taken prisoner. 

455 Squadron RAAF (squadron code prefix "UB")
 AT109 "UB-C", Squadron Leader James Catanach: strayed north of track, flak damage from submarine chaser UJ 1105 off the coast of Norway led to a forced landing on a beach at Molvika, near Kiberg and the crew being taken prisoner.
 P5304 "UB-H", Sergeant E. J. "Sandy" Smart: shot down over Sweden near Arvestuottar lake, north of Arjeplog, by a German fighter from Bodø; no survivors.
 P5323 "UB-L", P/O Rupert "Jeep" Patrick: ran out of fuel, made a wheels-up landing in an area of cut-down silver birch at Kandalaksha, Russia without casualties; the aircraft was damaged. (Either P5323 or AE310 was repaired and returned to service.)

Supermarine Spitfire PR Mk IV(D) (9–27 September 1942)

1 PRU RAF (squadron code prefix "LY")
 Build number and squadron code unknown, damaged on the ground during a German air raid at Vayenga  (9 September 1942) and written off.
 BP889, squadron code unknown, Flying Officer (F/O) Gavin Walker: shot down on a sortie to Altafiord and crashed on the shores of Lakselv, Norway, late on the morning of 27 September, killing Walker. Some sources suggest that BP889 was hit by ground fire near Alta airfield on the outward leg.  records suggest that Walker was shot down by  Kurt Dobner (11./JG 5, Banak airfield), flying a Focke-Wulf Fw 190 fighter.

Notes

Footnotes

Bibliography

Books
 
 
 
 
 
 
 
 
 
 
 
 
 
 
 
 
 
 
 
 
 

Websites

Further reading
Books
 
 

Websites

External links
 Kroupnik, Vladimir, 2011, RAAF in Russia, 16 April 2018
 Raebel, Geoff, 2010, RAAF in Russia 16 April 2018
 Laurimaa, Kalevi. 2012, RAF Bomber Forced to Land on Mountain Tsatsa in Sept. 1942 16 April 2016

Arctic military operations of World War II
Eastern Front (World War II)
1942 in Russia
Arctic convoys of World War II
Military history of the Soviet Union during World War II
20th-century Royal Air Force deployments
Aerial operations and battles of World War II involving Australia
Aerial operations and battles of World War II involving Germany
Aerial operations and battles of World War II involving the United Kingdom
Aerial operations and battles of World War II involving the Soviet Union
Severomorsk
Handley Page aircraft
Naval aviation operations and battles